Gökhan Bozkaya (born 12 May 1981 in Germany) is a Turkish retired footballer.

Bozkaya previously made 50 appearances for Sivasspor in the Super Lig.

References

External links
 Profile at Guardian's Stats Centre
 

1981 births
Living people
Turkish footballers
German people of Turkish descent
Sivasspor footballers
Antalyaspor footballers
Eskişehirspor footballers
Malatyaspor footballers
Giresunspor footballers
Kocaelispor footballers
Turkey youth international footballers
Association football forwards